Aaron Piers Summerscale (born 26 August 1969) is an English chess player who holds the title Grandmaster.

Summerscale was joint British Rapidplay Chess Champion in 2000. His current FIDE rating is 2449.

Books

External links
 
 

1969 births
Living people
Chess grandmasters
English chess players
English writers
British chess writers